The 2023 Nigerian Senate elections in Kebbi State will be held on 25 February 2023, to elect the 3 federal Senators from Kebbi State, one from each of the state's three senatorial districts. The elections will coincide with the 2023 presidential election, as well as other elections to the Senate and elections to the House of Representatives; with state elections being held two weeks later. Primaries were held between 4 April and 9 June 2022.

Background
In the previous Senate elections, all three incumbent senators were re-elected: Adamu Aliero (APC) held his seat with 73% of the vote in the Central district, Yahaya Abubakar Abdullahi (APC) won with 71% in the North district, and Bala Ibn Na'allah (APC) was returned with 67% in the South district. These results were a part of a slight swing to the Kebbi APC as most House of Representatives seats were won by the party, it won a majority in the House of Assembly, and Buhari won the state in the presidential election.

Overview

Summary

Kebbi Central 

The Kebbi Central Senatorial District covers the local government areas of Aliero, Birnin Kebbi, Bunza, Gwandu, Kalgo, Koko/Besse, and Maiyama. The incumbent Adamu Aliero (PDP) was re-elected with 73.4% of the vote in 2019 as a member of the APC; he initially sought renomination in the APC before withdrawing from the primary and defecting to win the PDP nomination in June 2022.

Primary elections

All Progressives Congress 

Observers view the APC senatorial primary as a continuation of the battle between the preexisting major factions of the Kebbi State APC with one faction led by Aliero and the other faction led by outgoing Governor (and senatorial candidate) Abubakar Atiku Bagudu. In the gubernatorial primary, Aliero backed the candidacy of Kebbi North Senator Yahaya Abubakar Abdullahi while Bagudu eventually supported union leader Nasir Idris. As Bagudu was a serving governor, his faction was recognized by the national party in February 2022 but the internal rift continued as Bagudu and Aliero jostled for the senatorial ticket. A few hours before the primary, Aliero withdrew in a letter alleging that the delegate list had been handpicked by Bagudu to rig the primary in his favour. In the primary, Bagudu was nominated unanimously; he thanked delegates in his acceptance speech. Aliero left the APC a few days later.

People's Democratic Party 

On the original primary date, an indirect primary in Birnin Kebbi resulted in Haruna Saidu—former Kebbi State PDP Chairman—being nominated unopposed. However, in the wake of Aliero's defection, the state party annulled the original primary and held a new exercise on 9 June where Aliero defeated Saidu by a wide margin. Saidu protested and sued against the new primary, claiming that he never withdrew as nominee and thus the second primary was invalid. In response, the state PDP expelled Saidu for taking the party to court over the issue and alleged forgery. However, a High Court ruled in favor of Saidu based on the fact that he had not withdrawn from the nomination thus making the rerun primary illegitimate. In early November, Aliero appealed the ruling at an Appeal Court sitting in Sokoto; the court ruled against Aliero later that month. However, Aliero's appeal to the Supreme Court was successful with its 30 January ruling reinstating him as the legitimate nominee.

Campaign 
Media described the Bagudu vs. Aliero race as a potentially definitive decider on the preeminent political godfather of Kebbi State. However, the court ruling that declared Saidu as the PDP nominee changed the dynamics of the race. By December, after Aliero lost his appeal, pundits began to question if his political career was over. However, Aliero's appeal to the Supreme Court was successful with its 30 January ruling reinstating him as the legitimate nominee.

General election

Results

Kebbi North 

The Kebbi North Senatorial District covers the local government areas of Arewa Dandi, Argungu, Augie, Bagudo, Dandi, Jega, and Suru. The incumbent Yahaya Abubakar Abdullahi (PDP) was re-elected with 70.9% of the vote in 2019 as a member of the APC. In May 2022, Abdullahi announced that he would run for governor of Kebbi State, instead of seeking re-election. However, Abdullahi lost the APC gubernatorial primary in late May. The next month, he defected to the PDP and was nominated in his new party's senatorial primary.

Primary elections

All Progressives Congress 

In the primary resulted in the nomination of former MHR Hussaini Suleiman Kangiwa. Suleiman Kangiwa was unopposed as his sole opponent—former Governor Usman Saidu Nasamu Dakingari—withdrew just before the primary.

People's Democratic Party 

On the original primary date, an indirect primary resulted in former MHR Ibrahim Bawa Kamba being nominated over fellow former MHR Sani Bawa Arugungu by a wide margin. However, the PDP later nominated incumbent Abdullahi after he joined the party.

Campaign 
While noting the ongoing litigation between Bawa Kamba and Abdullahi over the PDP nomination, reporting from The Nation in December gave the edge to Suleiman Kangiwa due to the APC's structural advantages in the district.

General election

Results

Kebbi South 

The Kebbi South Senatorial District covers the local government areas of Fakai, Ngaski, Sakaba, Shanga, Wasagu/Danko, Yauri, and Zuru. Incumbent Bala Ibn Na'allah (APC) was re-elected with 67.3% of the vote in 2019 and is seeking re-election.

Primary elections

All Progressives Congress 

The primary, held at the Zuru Town Hall in Zuru, resulted in the renomination of Na'allah as he defeated two challengers—Shehu Muazu and Sule-Iko Sami. After the primary, Na'allah thanked the delegates and pledged to win the general election.

People's Democratic Party 

The primary resulted in the nomination of Garba Musa Maidoki unopposed.

General election

Results

Notes

See also 
 2023 Nigerian Senate election
 2023 Nigerian elections

References 

Kebbi State senatorial elections
2023 Kebbi State elections
Kebbi State Senate elections